William De Vecchis (born 28 May 1971) is an Italian Senator. He is a member of the Italexit party, after leaving Lega Nord in 2022. He represents Lazio.

References 

1971 births
Living people
Senators of Legislature XVIII of Italy
Lega Nord politicians
Italexit politicians
21st-century Italian politicians
Politicians from Rome
20th-century Italian people